Skenea basistriata is a species of sea snail, a marine gastropod mollusk in the family Skeneidae.

Description
The length of the shell varies between 1.2 mm and 4 mm. The smooth, shining shell is narrowly umbilicated. It contains 4½ tumid whorls with a deep suture. These whorls are rapidly increasing in size. The base of the shell shows an oblique, arcuate stripe running into the umbilicus.

Distribution
This species occurs in European waters, and the Atlantic Boreal to Arctic region. It also has been found as a fossil in the Italian Pliocene.

References

 Jeffreys J. G., 1877: New and peculiar Mollusca of the Patellidae and other families of Gastropoda procured in the Valorous expedition; Annals and Magazine of Natural History (4) 19: 231–243
 Iberus : revista de la Sociedad Española de Malacología v.9 (1990)
 Gofas, S.; Le Renard, J.; Bouchet, P. (2001). Mollusca, in: Costello, M.J. et al. (Ed.) (2001). European register of marine species: a check-list of the marine species in Europe and a bibliography of guides to their identification. Collection Patrimoines Naturels, 50: pp. 180–213

External links
 

basistriata
Gastropods described in 1877